The Men's time trial of the 2018 UCI Road World Championships was a cycling event that took place on 26 September 2018 in Innsbruck, Austria. It was the 25th edition of the championship, for which Tom Dumoulin of the Netherlands was the defending champion, having won in 2017. 61 riders from 40 nations entered the competition.

Rohan Dennis became the second Australian male to win the world time trial title – after Michael Rogers, who won three consecutive titles between 2003 and 2005 – finishing almost a minute and a half clear of any other rider. The silver medal was more closely contested, with only 0.53 seconds covering the remaining medal-winners; it was settled in favour of defending champion Dumoulin, surpassing Belgium's Victor Campenaerts, the European champion, on the finish line.

Course
The race consisted of a route  in length, starting from Rattenberg and ending in Innsbruck.

Qualification
All National Federations were allowed to enter four riders for the race, with a maximum of two riders to start. In addition to this number, the outgoing World Champion and the current continental champions were also able to take part.

Participating nations
61 cyclists from 40 nations were scheduled to take part in the men's time trial. However, five riders – Eritrea's Mekseb Debesay and Daniel Teklehaimanot, Pakistan's Arsalan Anjum Muhammad and Najeeb Ullah and Eugert Zhupa from Albania – did not start, therefore reducing the event to 56 competitors from 37 nations. The number of cyclists per nation is shown in parentheses.

Final classification

All 56 race starters completed the -long course.

References

External links

Men's time trial
UCI Road World Championships – Men's time trial
2018 in men's road cycling